The GAA Hurling All-Ireland Minor Championship (known for sponsorship reasons as the Electric Ireland GAA Hurling All-Ireland Minor Championship) is an annual inter-county hurling competition organised by the Gaelic Athletic Association (GAA). It is the highest inter-county hurling competition for male players under the age of 17 in Ireland and has been contested every year - except for a three-year absence during the Emergency - since 1928.

The final, currently held on the third Sunday in August, is the culmination of a series of games played during July and August, with the winning team receiving the Irish Press Cup. The qualification procedures for the championship have changed several times throughout its history. Currently, qualification is limited to teams competing in the Leinster and Munster Championships as well as Galway. Having previously been played on a straight knockout basis, the championship has incorporated a round robin since 2018.

Five teams currently participate in the All-Ireland Championship, with the most successful teams coming from the provinces of Leinster and Munster. Kilkenny, Cork and Tipperary are considered "the big three" of hurling. They have won 61 championships between them.

The title has been won by 10 different teams, 9 of whom have won the title more than once. The all-time record-holders are Tipperary and Kilkenny, who have both won the championship on 21 occasions. Tipperary are the current champions.

History

Creation

Since 1887 the All-Ireland Senior Championship had provided inter-county games for adult males. This was supplemented by the creation of the All-Ireland Junior Championship in 1912 which provided a springboard to develop players before progressing to senior level. The All-Ireland Minor Championship was the third championship to be created and was aimed at developing younger players who were under the age of 18.

Beginning

The inaugural All-Ireland Championship in 1928 used a provincial format. 12 teams contested the respective championships in Leinster and Munster, with Cork and Dublin emerging as the respective champions. There were no representatives in Connacht or Ulster.

Cork and Dublin contested the first All-Ireland Championship match - the delayed final - on Sunday 1 September 1929 at Croke Park, Dublin. After a draw on the first day, Cork won the All-Ireland final replay on 27 October 1929 to take the title.

Development

The first two All-Ireland Championships featured the Munster and Leinster champions facing off in the All-Ireland final. The Ulster Championship was introduced in the 1930 necessitating the need for an All-Ireland semi-final to be introduced. The Connacht champions qualified for the first time in 1931, with the four provincial winners participating in two All-Ireland semi-finals. Over time the Leinster and Munster teams grew to become the superpowers of the game, as Gaelic football was the more dominant sport in Ulster and Connacht. After some time Galway became the only credible team in Connacht and was essentially given an automatic pass to the All-Ireland semi-final every year. This knock-out system persisted for nearly 60 years and was considered to be the fairest system as the All-Ireland champions would always be the only undefeated team of the year.

In the mid-1990s the Gaelic Athletic Association looked at developing a new system whereby a defeat in the championship for certain teams would not mean an immediate exit from the Championship. In the 1997 championship the first major change in format arrived when the 'back-door system' was introduced. This new structure allowed the defeated Munster and Leinster finalists another chance to regain a place in the All-Ireland semi-finals. Clare and Offaly were the first two teams to benefit from the new system when they qualified for the very first All-Ireland quarter-finals. Clare subsequently became the first team to win the All-Ireland Championship through the 'back-door' after a 1-11 to 1-09 defeat of Galway in the All-Ireland final.

Age reduction

On 26 January 2008, a radical motion was brought before a special Congress in an effort to combat player burnout. It was proposed to merge the existing under-21 and minor championships to create a new All-Ireland Under-19 Hurling Championship. This motion was defeated by 115 votes to 58.

In an effort to combat player burnout, a new proposal to change the championship from an under-18 competition to an under-17 one was introduced by GAA Director-General Páraic Duffy at Congress on 26 February 2016. The motion was narrowly passed by a 68.2% majority.

Team dominance

Since the beginning the championship has been dominated by Cork, Kilkenny and Tipperary. As of 2019, they have won a combined total of 59 of the 89 championship titles. These three teams began their hegemony by winning 12 of the first 14 championship titles between 1928 and 1941.

Cork and Tipperary set the first championship record during this time by becoming the first two teams to win three successive All-Ireland Championships. Dublin became the first team outside of the "big three" to win successive All-Ireland Championships in 1945 and 1946.

Tipperary dominated the post-Emergency era by contesting 15 of the 18 All-Ireland finals between 1945 and 1962, including six-in-a-row between 1952 and 1957. They claimed a further eight All-Ireland Championships during this time. After Kilkenny became the third team to win three successive All-Ireland Championships between 1960 and 1962, Wexford won their only three All-Ireland Championships between 1963 and 1968 as Cork reemerged to dominate the fifteen-year period between 1964 and 1979. During this time they claimed eight All-Ireland Championships from 12 final appearances. Kilkenny also reestablished themselves as the standard bearers of the Leinster Championship during this time and won five All-Ireland Championships from 12 final appearances between 1969 and 1984.

The 1980s saw Galway and Offaly claim their first All-Ireland Championships, while Limerick secured the Centenary-year title after a lapse of nearly 30 years.

Galway emerged as the most dominant team of the 21st century. Between 1999 and 2020 they claimed 11 All-Ireland Championships from 15 final appearances, including an historic 4-in-a-row from 2017 to 2020, being the first county to every achieve such a feat.

Current format

Championship
There are five teams in the All-Ireland Championship. During the course of a championship season (from July to August) six games are played comprising three group stage quarter-finals, two semi-finals and a final.

Qualification and progression

Trophy and medals

At the end of the All-Ireland final, the winning team is presented with a trophy. The Irish Press Cup is held by the winning team until the following year's final. Traditionally, the presentation is made at a special rostrum in the Ard Chomairle section of the Hogan Stand where GAA and political dignitaries and special guests view the match.

The cup is decorated with ribbons in the colours of the winning team. During the game the cup actually has both teams' sets of ribbons attached and the runners-up ribbons are removed before the presentation. The winning captain accepts the cup on behalf of his team before giving a short speech. Individual members of the winning team then have an opportunity to come to the rostrum to lift the cup.

On 30 August 1949, The Irish Press Ltd. announced that they had presented a silver cup to the Gaelic Athletic Association to mark the 21st anniversary of the All-Ireland Championship. The cup is modelled on an ancient Celtic mether. The cup was first presented to John O'Grady of Tipperary in 1949.

In accordance with GAA rules, the Central Council awards up to twenty-six gold medals to the winners of the All-Ireland final. The medals are 9 carat gold and depict the design of the GAA. Trophies are awarded to the All-Ireland runners-up.

Top winners

List of All-Ireland Finals

Recent finals

All-time record

Managers

Managers in the All-Ireland Championship are involved in the day-to-day running of the team, including the training, team selection, and sourcing of players from the club championships. Their influence varies from county-to-county and is related to the individual county boards. The manager is assisted by a team of two or three selectors and an extensive backroom team consisting of various coaches. Prior to the development of the concept of a manager in the 1970s, teams were usually managed by a team of selectors with one member acting as chairman.

Records and statistics

By decade
The most successful team of each decade, judged by number of All-Ireland Minor Hurling Championship titles, is as follows:

 1920s: 1 each for Cork (1928) and Waterford (1929)
 1930s: 4 for Tipperary (1930-32-33-34)
 1940s: 2 for Tipperary (1947–49)
 1950s: 6 for Tipperary (1952-53-55-56-57-59)
 1960s: 3 each for Kilkenny (1960-61-62), Wexford (1963-66-68) and Cork (1964–67-69)
 1970s: 5 for Cork (1970-71-74-78-79)
 1980s: 3 for Offaly (1986-87-89)
 1990s: 3 for Kilkenny (1990-91-93) and Galway (1992-94-99)
 2000s: 4 for Galway (2000-04-05-09)
 2010s: 5 for Galway (2011-15-17-18-19)

Gaps

Longest gaps between successive All-Ireland titles:
 65 years: Waterford (1948-2013)
 26 years: Limerick (1958-1984)
 20 years: Cork (2001-2021)
 19 years: Waterford (1929-1948)
 18 years: Limerick (1940-1958)
 17 years: Tipperary (1959-1976)
 14 years: Kilkenny (1936-1950)
 14 years: Tipperary (1982-1996)
 13 years: Tipperary (1934-1947)
 13 years: Cork (1951-1964)

Top scorers

By year

In finals

References

External links
 Official GAA Roll of Honour
 RTE Roll of Honour
 Roll of Honour on www.gaainfo.com

All-Ireland inter-county hurling championships